Jordan Thomas may refer to:

Jordan Thomas (karateka) (born 1992), British karateka
Jordan Thomas (American football) (born 1996), American football player
Jordan A. Thomas, American attorney, writer, speaker and media commentator
Jordan Thomas (footballer) (born 2001), English footballer